OIP may refer to:

 Ohio Institute of Photography, US
 Ovamboland Independence Party, later National Democratic Party, Namibia
 Oil-for-Food Programme, a former UN programme in Iraq
 Former Office of the Iraqi Programme
 × Oncidopsis (Oip.), an orchid nothogenus corresponding to Miltoniopsis × Oncidium; see × Burrageara